Puiești is a commune in Vaslui County, Western Moldavia, Romania. It is composed of thirteen villages: Bărtăluș-Mocani, Bărtăluș-Răzeși, Călimănești, Cetățuia, Cristești, Fântânele, Fulgu, Gâlțești, Iezer, Lălești, Puiești, Rotari and Ruși.

Natives
 Felix Aderca

References

Communes in Vaslui County
Localities in Western Moldavia